Agonopterix erythrella is a moth in the family Depressariidae. It was described by Snellen in 1884. It is found in south-eastern Siberia and Japan.

References

Moths described in 1884
Agonopterix
Moths of Asia
Moths of Japan
Taxa named by Samuel Constantinus Snellen van Vollenhoven